This is a list of notable financial institutions worldwide that were severely affected by the Great Recession centered in 2007–2009.  The list includes banks (including savings and loan associations, commercial banks and investment banks), building societies and insurance companies that were:
 taken over or merged with another financial institution;
 nationalised by a government or central bank; or
 declared insolvent or liquidated.

See also 

 List of bank failures in the United States (2008–present)

Notes 
 Acquired a nearly 80% share in exchange for a US$85 billion loan.
 Only trading assets, trading liabilities, and head offices were acquired.
 Only European and Middle Eastern equities and investment banking operations were acquired.
 Grupo Santander only acquired the savings portion of Bradford & Bingley; the company's loan portfolio was nationalised by the UK government.
 The Financial Supervisory Authority took control of the board of directors while Kaupthing Edge, its Internet bank, was taken over by ING Direct UK.

References 

Great Recession
Banks
Banks disestablished in 2007
Banks disestablished in 2008
Banks disestablished in 2009
Business-related lists